Woolshed Flat may refer to the following places in Australia:

Woolshed Flat, South Australia, a locality 
Woolshed Flat, Victoria, a locality in the Shire of Loddon
A railway station serving the Pichi Richi Railway
Woolshed Flat Railway Bridge, a railway bridge in Quorn, South Australia

See also
Woolshed (disambiguation)